The Chevin is the name given to the ridge on the south side of Wharfedale in Leeds, West Yorkshire, England, overlooking the market town of Otley, and often known as Otley Chevin.

Etymology
The origins of the name Chevin are uncertain; the earliest attestation is in an eleventh-century copy of a charter from 972 which gives the spelling scefinc, while a charter of around 1030 gives the form on Scefinge. The most probable origin, according to a range of authorities, is a Brittonic word whose modern Welsh descendant is cefn ("back", "ridge", "ridge of high land"). This word appears in other hill-names, such as Cefn Cribwr and Cefn Bryn in Glamorgan amongst many others in Wales, and also, it has been argued, The Cheviot in Northumberland, and the Cévennes in France.

One of the steep hillsides of the Chevin is called the Great Dib, first attested in 1290 as Dibe. Since dib is a Middle English word for 'pool', this name probably originally referred to a pool at the foot of the slope.

History and features

The Chevin is largely covered in attractive old woodland and heathland. It is a part of the Carboniferous Millstone Grit group.

Surprise View is the more visited summit of the Chevin and offers extensive views of Otley and Wharfedale, and has an adjacent car park. It is the site of a cross erected every Easter since 1969.

Parts of the Chevin, known as the Danefield Estate, belonged to landowner Walter Fawkes and his descendants. After World War II these areas were donated to Otley Urban District Council as a memorial to those from the Wharfe Valley who had lost their lives during the war.

Recreation

Several outcrops of rock are distributed across the upper slopes of the Chevin and are popular for climbing and bouldering. The Chevin also has a number of footpaths and bridlepaths, and is popular with walkers, runners and riders. It is crossed by the Leeds link to the Dales Way, and the Ebor Way. There is also an Orienteering course in the forest park, with maps available from the local tourist office. Chevin Forest parkrun takes place at 9am every Saturday morning - it is a free, weekly, timed, 5 km run, organised by local volunteers. As a recreational area, the Chevin is divided in two by the East Chevin Road.

The Chevin in art
The famous painting Snow Storm: Hannibal and His Army Crossing the Alps by J. M. W. Turner which hangs in the Tate Gallery, is reputed to have been inspired by a view of the Chevin with a stormy background sky. Turner used to stay with his friend Walter Fawkes at Farnley Hall on the opposite side of the valley to the Chevin. Recalling a day in the autumn of 1810 Fawkes' son, Hawkesworth, remembered a storm that inspired one of Turner's major paintings:

"Hawkey! Hawkey! Come here! Come here! Look at this thunder-storm. Isn't it grand? isn't it wonderful? – isn't it sublime?" All this time he was making notes of its form and colour on the back of a letter. I proposed some better drawing-block, but he said it did very well. He was absorbed – he was entranced. There was the storm rolling and sweeping and shafting out its lightning over the Yorkshire hills. Presently the storm passed and he finished. "There Hawkey," said he, "In two years you will see this again, and call it Hannibal Crossing the Alps."
 
Otley indie rock band The Chevin take their name from the hill.

References

External links
 Chevin Forest Park, Leeds City Council's website
 Chevin Forest website
 Chevin Forest Park Local Nature Reserve Management Plan 2007–2016

Hills of West Yorkshire
Environment of West Yorkshire
Wharfedale
Otley